The Rena or Renaelva is a river in Innlandet county, Norway. This river is a tributary of the large river Glomma. Kjøllsæter Bridge connects the east and west side of the river. The  river Julussa flows from south through the Julussdalen valley and into the river Rena.

The river begins at the confluence of the rivers Tysla and Unsetåa which is just south of the Fonnåsfjellet mountain and just north of the village of Bergset. The river flows south through the lakes Lomnessjøen and Storsjøen and when the river reaches the village of Rena, just flows into the large river Glomma.

A tunnel has been built to transport part of the water from the upper Glomma river into the Rena river in order to optimize the production of electricity by nearby power plants.

See also
List of rivers in Norway

References

Rendalen
Åmot
Rivers of Innlandet